These page shows the results of the Synchronized Swimming Competition at the 1971 Pan American Games, held from July 30 to August 13, 1971 in Cali, Colombia. There were three medal events. Synchronized swimming returned as a sport in the Pan Am Games after being skipped in the 1967 edition.

Solo

Duet

Team

Medal table

References
 Sports 123

1971
1971 Pan American Games
1971 in synchronized swimming